Guillaume Schütz (31 March 1903 – 26 November 1932) was a Luxembourgian footballer. He competed in the men's tournament at the 1928 Summer Olympics.

References

External links
 
 

1903 births
1932 deaths
Luxembourgian footballers
Luxembourg international footballers
Olympic footballers of Luxembourg
Footballers at the 1928 Summer Olympics
Sportspeople from Luxembourg City
Association football forwards
Union Luxembourg players